The Rajamandala (or Raja-mandala meaning "circle of kings"; , mandala is a Sanskrit word that means "circle") was formulated by the Indian author Chanakya (Kautilya) in his work on politics, the Arthashastra (written between 4th century BCE and 2nd century CE). It describes circles of friendly and enemy states surrounding the king's (raja) state. Also known as Mandala theory of foreign policy or Mandala theory, the theory has been called as one of Kautilya's most important postulations regarding foreign policy.

Terminology
The term draws a comparison with the mandala of the Hindu and Buddhist worldview; the comparison emphasises the radiation of power from each power center, as well as the non-physical basis of the system.

The terminology was revived two millenniums later as a result of twentieth-century efforts to comprehend patterns of diffuse but coherent political power. Metaphors such as social anthropologist Tambiah's idea of a "galactic polity", describe such political patterns as the mandala. Historian Victor Lieberman preferred the metaphor of a "solar polity," as in the solar system, where there is one central body, the sun, and the components or planets of the solar system. The "Rajamandala" concept of ancient India was the prototype for the Mandala model of South East Asian political systems in later centuries, established by British historian O. W. Wolters.

See also 
 Cakravartin
 Greater India 
 Indosphere
 Geopolitics
 Mandala (political model)
 The enemy of my enemy is my friend

References

Bibliography 
 King, Governance, and Law in Ancient India: Kauṭilya's Arthaśāstra, translated and annotated by Patrick Olivelle, Oxford University Press, 2013
 , especially Book Six: Circle of Kings as the Basis, pp. 305–312
 
 
 
 

Anthropology of religion
Indian feudalism
Social anthropology
Economic anthropology
Political theories